A captor refers to someone who holds others in captivity. It may refer to:

Entertainment
 Captors (album), debut studio album by Christian metal band Wolves at the Gate (2012)
 The Captors (novel), novel by John Farris (1969)
 "Captors", song by I Concur (2008)
 Sollux and Mituna Captor, characters in the webcomic Homestuck (2009–2016)

Military use
 Euroradar CAPTOR, or Captor-M, the radar system of the Eurofighter Typhoon
 Mark 60 CAPTOR (enCAPsulated TORpedo),  the United States Navy 's primary anti-submarine naval mine
 USS Captor (PYc-40), a 1938 Q-ship of the United States Navy

See also
 Cardcaptor Sakura, Japanese manga series (1996–2000)
 Ninja Captor, Japanese live-action television drama (1976–1977)